Haimbachia proaraealis is a moth in the family Crambidae. It was described by Stanisław Błeszyński in 1961. It is found on Mahé in Seychelles and in South Africa and Zimbabwe.

References

Haimbachiini
Moths described in 1961